The 1876 South Shropshire by-election was fought on 3 November 1876.  The byelection was fought due to the death of the incumbent Conservative MP, Percy Egerton Herbert.  It was won by the unopposed Conservative candidate John Edmund Severne.

References

1876 elections in the United Kingdom
1876 in England
19th century in Shropshire
By-elections to the Parliament of the United Kingdom in Shropshire constituencies
Unopposed by-elections to the Parliament of the United Kingdom in English constituencies